These are the Billboard magazine number-one albums for each week in 1970.

Chart history

See also
1970 in music
List of number-one albums (United States)

References

1970
1970 record charts